Emma Jane Evelyn Benton-Hughes (born 1964) known as Eve Vorley is an English football club director and former pornographic actress and film director. She is the former partner of West Ham United owner, David Sullivan. Vorley was appointed to the board of West Ham United in January 2021.

Adult film
Vorley is a former Page 3 girl. She met David Sullivan through their work in the adult film industry. According to her brother, Jonny Trunk, Varley began in the pornography industry after she fell on hard times after her husband left her. She appeared in several adult films in the 1990s and early 2000s starring in the films  'Lesbian Nurses', 'Naked Neighbours' and 'Electric Blue: Nude Wives – Private Parts'. She also directed the films 'Horny Housewives on the Job' and 'Sex Mad Secretaries' and produced the films 'The Art of Oral Sex' and 'Sex Mad Secretaries' but is no longer involved in the film industry.

West Ham United
Vorley was appointed as a director of Premier League club, West Ham United in January 2021. In addition to being a director, she is also a fan of the club. As a director Vorley was permitted to watch West Ham home games at the London Stadium at a time when supporters were banned from attending due to the COVID-19 pandemic.

References

External links
 

1964 births
Association football supporters
English pornographic film actresses
English pornographic film directors
Living people
Page 3 girls
West Ham United F.C. directors and chairmen